

References
  (L-asparagine)

Chemical data pages
Chemical data pages cleanup